Charles Ross "Sandy" Somerville (May 4, 1903 – May 17, 1991) was a Canadian golfer and all-around athlete.

Somerville was born in London, Ontario. He won six Canadian Amateur Championship golf titles between 1926 and 1937, and in 1932 became the first Canadian to win the U.S. Amateur. He was selected by the Canadian Press as Canada's athlete of the year for 1932, and in 1950 was picked as Canada's top golfer of the first half of the 20th century.

While at the University of Toronto, Somerville played for three years for the Varsity Blues football team and Varsity Blues men's ice hockey team (1921–24). He was also one of Canada's top cricket players.

Later, Somerville won three Canadian senior golf titles. and served as president of the Royal Canadian Golf Association in 1957.

Somerville was inducted into Canada's Sports Hall of Fame (1955), the Canadian Olympic Hall of Fame (1985), the Canadian Golf Hall of Fame (1971), the U of T Sports Hall of Fame (1987) and the London (Ontario) Sports Hall of Fame (2002). He died at age 88 in 1991.

The London Hunt Club, Somerville's home course for most of his life, has a room in its clubhouse honouring Somerville's golf achievements.

Tournament wins 
 1926 Canadian Amateur
 1926 Manitoba Amateur
 1928 Canadian Amateur
 1930 Canadian Amateur
 1931 Canadian Amateur
 1932 U.S. Amateur
 1935 Canadian Amateur
 1937 Canadian Amateur
 1960 Canadian Senior Championship
 1961 Canadian Senior Championship
 1965 Canadian Senior Championship
 1966 Canadian Senior Championship

Professional and amateur majors shown in bold.

Major championships

Amateur wins (1)

Results timeline

Note: As an amateur, Somerville did play in the PGA Championship.

NYF = Tournament not yet founded
NT = No tournament
DNQ = Did not qualify for match play portion
R256, R128, R64, R32, R16, QF, SF = Round in which player lost in match play
"T" indicates a tie for a place

Source for U.S. Amateur: USGA Championship Database

Source for 1933 British Open: www.opengolf.com

Source for 1933 British Amateur: The Glasgow Herald, June 23, 1933, pg. 20.

Source for 1934 & 1938 Masters: www.masters.com

Source for 1935 British Amateur: The Glasgow Herald, May 21, 1935, pg. 3.

Source for 1938 British Amateur: The Glasgow Herald, May 28, 1938, pg. 11.

External links
Silent Sandy, from Ontario Golf Magazine
Profile at Canadian Golf Hall of Fame

Canadian male golfers
Amateur golfers
Golfing people from Ontario
Ridley College alumni
Toronto Varsity Blues football players
Toronto Varsity Blues ice hockey players
Sportspeople from London, Ontario
1903 births
1991 deaths